Yury Shumanski (born 21 September 1980) is a retired Belarusian professional footballer.

Career

Shumanski started his career with Torpedo Zhodino.

References

External links

1980 births
Living people
Belarusian footballers
Association football defenders
FC Torpedo-BelAZ Zhodino players
FC SKVICH Minsk players
FC Belshina Bobruisk players
FC Neman Grodno players
Belarus under-21 international footballers
People from Zhodzina
Sportspeople from Minsk Region